NSTS is a four-letter abbreviation which may refer to:
 The National Space Transportation System, known usually as the Space Shuttle program
 The National Talent Search Examination, an Indian scholarship program.